The New Hampshire Revised Statutes Annotated (RSA) forms the codified law of the state subordinate to the New Hampshire State Constitution.

History
The RSA is a set of law books published by Thomson West.  The work of updating the previous codification, the Revised Laws (RL) of 1942, was authorized by law in 1953 and was "not intended to change the meaning of the law as it existed on December 31, 1954."  The work was done by a New Hampshire Revision Commission, which describes what it did at the start of each volume of the RSA, and was ratified in 1955 by statute.

A predecessor of Thomson West acquired the business of publishing the RSA from Equity Publishing Corp., founded by former governor Meldrim Thomson Jr.  It was a sore spot with some lawyers that, to purchase law books, they had to do business with the arch-conservative Thomson.

Contents
The RSA endeavors to collect all the current laws "of a public and general nature" in a single, numbered set.  The United States Constitution and of the New Hampshire Constitution are included in the RSA.

The RSA is structured as follows:
 Titles addressing a general topic;
 Chapters; and
 Sections, which may be one or more paragraphs.

Each section of the RSA includes annotations, such as a summary of court cases that were decided based on that section, a list of other cases that cited the section, cross-references to other parts of the RSA, and references to relevant legal publications.

The printed books are reissued occasionally.  After each legislative session, pamphlets with cumulative changes to a given volume are issued, to be inserted in a pocket at the rear of the volume.  A reissued volume incorporates all such changes.

Disposition tables appear in the printed set and in each set of pamphlets.  They let the reader determine the disposition of the previous codification (the RL) and of each enactment of the New Hampshire legislature: where that text was placed in the RSA.  In cases where source text was omitted from the RSA (for example, a law that is now obsolete or superseded by another), the disposition tables give the rationale.

Text of the law is the property of the state of New Hampshire, and can be read and searched without the annotations on the state web site.  The annotations are value added by Thomson West.

The numbering of laws becomes obsolete through subsequent work of the legislature.  New chapters of law may be added; a new chapter to be located between Chapter 1 and Chapter 2 is called Chapter 1-A.  Repealed chapters are shown without their former text but with a note that they were repealed.  Their chapter numbers will not be reused until the next complete recodification.

In some cases (see the list below), an entire title has been recodified.  The chapters of the old title are repealed and new chapters are added at the end as a new title.  Single chapters are often recodified and given a number with a suffix such as -A.  They replace the entire old chapter.  Either recodification technique makes it easier to see the current law in one place, without requiring recodification of parts of the RSA that are changed less frequently.

Titles in the RSA
Title I: The State and Its Government (RSA Chapters 1-21)
Title II
Title III: Towns, Cities, Villages and Municipal Places (RSA Chapters 31-53E)
Title IV: Elections(Old) (RSA Chapters 51-70)
Title V: Taxation (RSA Chapters 71-90)
Title VI
Title VII
Title VIII
Title IX
Title X
Title XI
Title XII
Title XIII
Title XIV
Title XV
Title XVI
Title XVII
Title XVIII Fish and Game (Chapter 206-215C)
Title XIX
Title XX Transportation (Chapter 228-240)
Title XXI
Title XXII
Title XXIII
Title XXIV
Title XXV
Title XXVI
Title XXVII
Title XXVIII
Title XXIX
Title XXX Occupations and Professions (Chapters 309-322I)
Title XXXI
Title XXXII
Title XXXIII
Title XXXIV
Title XXXV
Title XXXVI
Title XXXVII
Title XXXVIII
Title XXXIX
Title XL
Title XLI
Title XLII
Title XLIII
Title XLIV
Title XLV
Title XLVI
Title XLVII
Title XLVIII
Title XLIX
Title L
Title LI
Title LII
Title LIII
Title LIV
Title LV
Title LVI
Title LVII
Title LVIII
Title LIX
Title LX
Title LXI
Title LXII
Title LXIII:Elections (Current) (RSA Chapters 652-671)
Title LXIV

References

External links
NH RSAs Online

Revised
United States state legal codes